"Tall Tales Taste Like Sour Grapes" is a song by the American art rock band, Fair to Midland. It was originally the ninth track on their album Fables from a Mayfly: What I Tell You Three Times Is True, and was released as their second single in 2007. The song was first released on their independent sampler disc, Selections From Fables From a Mayfly.

Charts

Track listing

References 

2007 singles
Fair to Midland songs
Song recordings produced by David Bottrill
2007 songs